Marcano  is a surname of Spanish origin. The Italian version of this surname is "Marciano". It was a military family that came to the New World with Christopher Columbus. The Family later grew and spread throughout the Caribbean, where the surname became rooted in the countries of Dominican Republic, Puerto Rico, Cuba and Venezuela (Margarita Island) and eventually Trinidad & Tobago.

Notable people with the surname include: 
Alfredo Marcano (1947–2009), Venezuelan boxer
Arturo J. Marcano Guevara, Venezuelan sports author and activist
Bobby Marcano (1951–1990), Venezuelan baseball player
César Marcano (born 1987), Venezuelan cyclist
Cristina Marcano (born 1960), Venezuelan biographer of Hugo Chávez
Danielle Marcano (born 1997), American soccer player
Elias Marcano (born 1971), Venezuelan wrestler
Héctor Marcano (born 1956), Puerto Rican television producer, host, actor and comedian
 Gustavo Marcano (born 1979), Venezuelan lawyer and politician former mayor of  Diego Bautista Urbaneja Municipality
Iván Marcano (born 1987), Spanish footballer
Jason Marcano (1983–2019), Trinidad and Tobago footballer
Jesús Rosas Marcano (1930–2001), Venezuelan educator, journalist, poet and composer
Karen Marcano (born 1979), Venezuelan bowler
Liz Yeraldine Marcano Cabeza (born 1992), Venezuelan karateka
Luis Marcano (1831–1870), Dominican general
María Marcano de León, Puerto Rican government official
Neville Marcano (1916–1993), Trinidad and Tobago musician and boxer
Noé Marcano (born 1980), Puerto Rican politician
Pablo Marcano García (born 1952), Puerto Rican artist
Ray Marcano, American journalist, music critic and editor
Soraya Marcano (born 1965), American artist
Tucupita Marcano (born 1999), Venezuelan baseball player
Zuray Marcano (born 1954), Venezuelan Paralympic powerlifter and educator

References
 Diario Las Americas, Los Hermanos Marcano by A.P. Marcano, October 10, 1976 
Historia de Familias Cubanas (Ediciones Universal, Miami, Florida 1985 ) 
 Bayamo by Jose Maceo Verdecia pages 193-199 (Havana, Cuba, Unknown date)

Surnames of Spanish origin